663 Gerlinde is a minor planet orbiting the Sun.

References

External links 
 Lightcurve plot of 663 Gerlinde, Palmer Divide Observatory, B. D. Warner (2005)
 Asteroid Lightcurve Database (LCDB), query form (info )
 Dictionary of Minor Planet Names, Google books
 Asteroids and comets rotation curves, CdR – Observatoire de Genève, Raoul Behrend
 Discovery Circumstances: Numbered Minor Planets (1)-(5000) – Minor Planet Center
 
 

Background asteroids
Gerlinde
Gerlinde
X-type asteroids (Tholen)
19080624